Cuthbert Antony Norris (9 January 1917 in Cradley, Worcestershire – 25 February 2005 in Worcester) was an English ornithologist. He was a member of the RSPB's council in the 1950s and 1960s, chairing its finance and general purposes committee. During that time, he persuaded the organisation to move from London to its current headquarters at The Lodge, Sandy, Bedfordshire. Using his own money to facilitate the transaction he was, for one day, owner of the Lodge.

Norris was BTO President from 1961–1964 and was awarded their Bernard Tucker Medal in 1959. He was also secretary and chairman of the West Midland Bird Club from 1953–1975 and its president from 1975–1999. He was the youngest member of the British Ornithologists' Union. He was the instigator of the Bardsey Bird and Field Observatory and was the youngest member of the British Ornithologists' Union.

In December 1958 he presented a talk on the BBC Home Service, In Search of Prunella, about the alpine accentor (Prunella collaris).

In 1940, he married Cicely Hurcomb, daughter of Lord Hurcomb, and they had two daughters. He ran a garden nursery and specialised in growing South African nerine lilies, for which he was awarded an RHS gold medal. Cicely died in 1976 and in 1985 Norris bred a Nerine 'Cicely Norris', named in her honour 

He was a personal friend of Peter Scott and assisted him in setting up the Wildfowl and Wetlands Trust.

Bibliography
(incomplete)
The Distribution and Status of the Corncrake

 (published for private circulation)

References

External links
 - obituary, linking to others.

1917 births
2005 deaths
English ornithologists
People from Cradley, West Midlands
British Trust for Ornithology people
20th-century British zoologists